The Administration of Justice Act 1696 (8 & 9 Will 3 c 11) was an Act of the Parliament of England, originally titled An Act for the better preventing of frivolous and vexatious Suits.

Repeals
Sections 1 to 3 and 5 to 7 were repealed by section 2 of, and Part II of the Schedule to, the Civil Procedure Acts Repeal Act 1879. This repeal did not operate in respect of any court other than the Supreme Court of Judicature in England.

Sections 1 to 3 and 5 to 7 were repealed by section 4 of the Statute Law Revision and Civil Procedure Act 1883. But see section 7 of that Act as to the Lancaster Palatine Court and the inferior civil courts (now abolished).

Sections 99(1)(f) and (g) of, and Schedule 1 to, the Supreme Court of Judicature (Consolidation) Act 1925 provided that the whole Act, so far as unrepealed, could be repealed by rules of court made under section 99 of the Supreme Court of Judicature Act 1925.

Section 4 was repealed by section 2 of, and Part I of the Schedule to, the Civil Procedure Acts Repeal Act 1879.

In Section 8, the words from "from and after" to "ninety and seven" were repealed by section 1 of, and Schedule 1 to, the Statute Law Revision Act 1948.

Case reference
The Act was referred to by the Lord Chancellor in the House of Lords decision on Clydebank Engineering and Shipbuilding Co. Ltd. v. Don Jose Ramos Yzquierdo y Castaneda'' (1904) as the law "upon which English lawyers rely" for making the distinction between damages and penalties.

See also
Administration of Justice Act

References
Halsbury's Statutes,

Acts of the Parliament of England
1696 in law
1696 in England